Gouge may refer to:

Gouge (chisel), a form of chisel or adze, a woodworking tool
Gouge (grape), another name for the European wine grape Gouais blanc
Gouge noir, another name for the French wine grape Gouget noir
Eye-gouging (rugby union), an offence in rugby union
Eye-gouging, the act of pressing or tearing the eye
Fault gouge, an unconsolidated rock type
Shale Gouge Ratio, a mathematical algorithm to predict fault rock types
Seabed gouging by ice, such as an iceberg or sea ice ridge
Gouging (fighting style), an antiquated form of combat in the back-country United States
Fish-hooking, gouging as part of self-defence or martial arts
Price gouging, a legal term
As a surname
Herbert Dillon Gouge (1843–1917), public servant in South Australia
Thomas Gouge (1609–1681), English Presbyterian clergyman
William Gouge (1575–1653), English clergyman and author

tl:Pait